The Fiat Fiorino is a small commercial vehicle produced by the Italian car manufacturer Fiat since 1977. Its first two generations have been the panel van derivatives of other small models, such as the Fiat 127 and Fiat Uno, while the current third generation was developed jointly with PSA Peugeot Citroën (both of which merged into Stellantis), and is based on the Fiat Small platform.

The current generation, the Sevel LAV, is also built with a passenger body style, as the Fiat Qubo, and is marketed along with its rebadged versions, the Citroën Nemo and the Peugeot Bipper. It is positioned below the Fiat Doblò, the Citroën Berlingo, and the Peugeot Partner, in each manufacturer's model line up.

The name comes from the fiorino d'oro, an old Italian coin normally translated into English as the Florin.

First generation (1977–1988)

The platform is a stretched version of the Brazilian 147 with a different rear suspension.

It was launched in early November 1977 as a panel van with the same 903 cc (100 GL.000) OHV inline-four petrol engine as used in the Fiat 127. In March 1979 the 1050 cc OHC Fiasa engine was added, as was the glazed passenger version (Panorama). 1979 was also when right-hand drive production began, enabling sales in the United Kingdom and other nations that drive on the left. British buyers were only offered the larger 1.05-litre engine.

In 1981 Mirafiori production came to an end, bringing with it a change to the front appearance of most European-market Fiorinos. The car now received the 147's taller front sheetmetal with an additional air intake beneath the grille rather than the original 127's design. The Italian-made 903 cc engine was dropped, while the new 1301 cc (127 D.000) SOHC diesel engine was introduced. While the Brazilian 147 passenger version received a facelift with square headlights (called "Europa"), the Fiorino largely soldiered on with the original sheetmetal. The Pick-up City and better equipped versions of the Fiorino van used the new Europa front beginning in 1982.

For right-hand drive markets, the Fiorino kept the original 127 underpinnings and design. These cars were available only as vans, with either a flat roof or with the "Hi-Top" roof and were built by Bertone, who was also assembling the X1/9 and the Ritmo Cabriolet for Fiat. The 127-series Fiorino received a light facelift in 1985, including Fiat's five-bar grille, the Ducato's wing mirrors, and a five-speed manual transmission. Production ended in late 1987, still using the original sheetmetal with quarterlights in the front doors.

At the same time, Fiat dropped the "127" portion of the name in Europe, and called the vehicle simply Fiorino. In September 1980, the Fiorino was launched in Brazil, based on the locally built Fiat 147, and fitted with its 1.3-liter engine. Fiat had already been offering a pick-up using the 147's shorter bodywork since late 1978 ("147 Pickup", available with the 1050 or the 1300 engine), but in 1981 this was changed over to the longer Panorama/Fiorino chassis. The longer pick-up was available as a standard version, and from 1982 also as the better equipped 147 City, which received the square forward leaning headlights of the 1981 facelift model. Another facelift was launched in 1983, with the new front grille based on the South American Fiat 127/147 Unificata. In South America, this new front was only gradually introduced as some lower cost versions retained the original design until 1986.

From 1982 Brazilian Fiorino buyers could choose from at least four versions of the high cube design. The Furgão was a two-seater panel van, the Vetrato was a glazed two-seater van, and the new Combinata received removable facing benches (seating six additional passengers with a minimum of comfort) at the rear. These three versions all received a cargo divider, unlike the Settegiorni which was a station wagon with seating for five. This was also new for 1982 and was the equivalent of the European Fiorino Panorama/Combi model.

In Europe, Fiat sold the Ognitempo kit to transform the Fiorino into a camper.

Production
The Fiorino was assembled from 1977 to 1981 in the Mirafiori factory in Torino, Italy, alongside the Fiat 127. In 1980, production began in the Minas Gerais plant, Brazil where the Fiat 147 (and related 127 Panorama) were manufactured. In 1981, production for the European market was transferred from Mirafiori to Minas Gerais. Cars for right-hand drive markets (and some other European markets) were built by Bertone until late 1987, using the original 127 front design.

After Brazilian production ceased in 1988, the tooling was transferred to Argentina. The Fiorino continued to be manufactured by Sevel Argentina from August 1989 as a van or pickup and sold for the local market. The Argentinian cars were equipped with a locally made 1.3-liter petrol engine (a version of the Fiat 128 SOHC engine) or the Brazilian-made 1.3 diesel with  respectively. The petrol engine was later replaced with a low compression, low octane version of the more modern 1.4-liter engine as also seen in the Spazio/Vivace. 25,035 units of the first generation Fiorino were built in the Córdoba factory between 1989 and 1995, and a total of 250,545 units of the Fiorino were built in the Betim factory in Brazil between 1980 and 1988. Of these, 172,086 were vans and 78,459 were pick-up versions respectively. The pick-up was very successful in Brazil's home market, with over three quarters of the production staying at home while nearly 90 percent of the Fiorino vans built went to export, mainly to Europe.

Spanish version
In Spain, a commercial vehicle based on the SEAT 127 (a Spanish version of the Italian 127 built under license Fiat by SEAT) was produced from 1980 by coachbuilder Emelba and called the Emelba 127 Poker.

The 127 Poker has a similar "high cube" box design of the Fiorino, but different rear doors, rear lights, and rear suspension. The 127 Poker was designed by Elba Design studio and was available as a panel van, passenger version, and coupe utility (pick up). It was fitted with the 903-cc Fiat petrol engine and was sold directly through SEAT dealerships in Spain.

Production ended in 1986 when it was replaced by the Panda-based SEAT Terra, which shares its engine with the SEAT 127. The Spanish 127 Poker was built at the headquarters of Emelba in Girona, Catalonia.

Engines

Second generation (1988–2014)

In 1987, the second generation version (project code: Type 146) was released, based on the Brazilian Uno-derived Fiat Duna sedan. While similar in appearance to the European Uno, the Duna had a more robust chassis and was more suitable as the basis for a commercial vehicle. The new Fiorino was available in panel van (Fiorino Cargo), passenger (Fiorino Panorama), and pickup body styles. European sales commenced in 1988. In Venezuela, the pickup version was sold as the Premio Pickup, linking it to the related sedan model. The original pickup version (1988-1992) was sold as the Uno Pickup in Brazil but later joined the Fiorino lineup.

The Fiorino sold over 250,000 units in the European market by the end of 2000. The Fiorino ceased to be imported to the United Kingdom in 2001, a year after production for European export had ceased.

In 1989 the Brazilian-made Fiorino became the first vehicle to be fitted with a new 1.5-liter derivative of the long running Fiasa engine. In Europe, this was also available with a three-way catalyst and fuel injection, a version which produced  at 5600 rpm.

Continental European buyers could also get the 128-based 1.1-litre engine, producing  at 5500 rpm. In European markets, the phase I Fiorino pickup was only available with the diesel engine.

First facelift (phase II)
In 1992, a facelifted Fiorino debuted with styling inspired by the Fiat Tipo. It also received a re-engineered platform, a new interior, and optional cleaner engines.

Second facelift (phase III)
In 1994, a new version based on the Fiat Mille platform debuted. While the front design remained initially unchanged, it sat on a longer wheelbase and the new rear side panels had single side windows (or single blank pressings) rather than the multiple divisions of the original model. The gas cap was now covered by an integrated flap, rather than being exposed as before. Petrol versions received the 1.4-liter "Tipo" engine, although Brazilian buyers were also offered the option of a one-liter model to suit that country's tax structure. The catalyzed 1.4-liter engine, as sold in Europe, develops .

The phase III version was assembled in the Minas Gerais plant and remained on sale in Brazil, Paraguay, Argentina, and Chile until the end of 2013, in anticipation of the requirement for dual SRS airbags and ABS brakes in the Brazilian market from 2014 onwards. The last facelift for the European market included a grille without a horizontal bar and took place in 1997. The phase III Fiorinos received another new grille for 2001, which was updated again in 2002 as Fiat's five-bar logo was replaced with the new centenary, wreath-style logo.

ABS and driver SRS airbag had been available as extra-cost options for the second generation Fiorino from the end of 1998 to 2001, but since the dashboard could not fit a passenger airbag without extensive changes, it was more cost-effective to phase it out and replace it with a newer model.

The second-generation Fiorino was also assembled in Argentina by Sevel Argentina. Over 1,000,000 Fiorinos have been sold in South America.

Third facelift (phase IV)
In 2004, a facelifted version was released with the Fiat Doblò front style. In 2009, Fiat introduced a new version with the red Fiat logo on the front.

Brazilian production of the second generation of Fiorino ended in December 2013 when the new generation (based on the platform of the new Brazilian Fiat Uno) was unveiled. The Fiorino was the leader of the segment for twenty three consecutive years. A total of 981,922 Fiorinos was built in Betim, Brazil: 775,620 Cargo/Panorama and 206,302 pick-ups.

Engines
Available engines were the Fiat 1.7 L 8V diesel (naturally aspirated or turbocharged), the 1.3-litre "Fiasa" engine, the 1.2 L and the 1.4 L 8V Fire, and for South America, the Fiasa Flex 1.0 L and 1.5 L 8V. In Brazil, both versions of the later 1242 cc engines were available with flexible fuel technology.

 1.0 L petrol
 1.2 L Fire petrol
 1.4 L petrol
 1.5 L flex fuel (spi and mpi versions)
 1.7 L diesel and turbodiesel

Third generation

Europe (2007–2021)

The third generation Fiat Fiorino (Type 225) leisure activity vehicle was unveiled in October 2007, and went on sale in February 2008. The Fiorino shares architecture and body work with the Citroën Nemo and Peugeot Bipper under the Sevel joint venture between Fiat and PSA Peugeot Citroën (which has merged to Stellantis since 2021). Production began in November 2007.

Built by Tofaş in Bursa, Turkey, they are produced in both panel van and passenger body styles, and are situated below the larger LAVs Fiat Doblò, Citroën Berlingo and Peugeot Partner, in their manufacturers' line ups. Fiat also retails its passenger model as the Fiat Qubo, with the Fiorino name designating the commercial models.

This project can be seen as a breakthrough in Tofaş history as it carried most of the development work in addition to responsibility for its assembly.

Fiat launched their passenger carrying equivalent at the Geneva Motor Show in March 2008. It is branded as the Fiat Qubo. A derivative of the Fiorino (a small MPV), a passenger version of the Fiorino was unveiled in June 2008.

In some countries (such as Turkey), the passenger version Qubo was sold as the "Fiorino Panorama".

As of 2020, the Fiat Qubo passenger variant has ceased production. The Fiorino commercial version remains available.

Peugeot Bipper and Citroën Nemo (2008-2017)

The Citroën Nemo is a badge engineered van launched in January 2008 by Citroën. The vehicle is the result of a partnership between Fiat, PSA Peugeot Citroën and Tofaş. The other platform derivatives are the Peugeot Bipper and the Fiat Fiorino.

The Citroën Nemo Combi (then, Nemo Multispace) is a small MPV, which was also introduced in 2008, and is based on the same platform.

In April 2010, during a routine evasive manoeuvre test, conducted in Germany, the vehicle rolled over. The shape of the vehicle; as a high bodied, short wheelbase van caused the roll. The addition of Electronic stability control (ESC) would likely have prevented this but was not available as standard or as an option on the Nemo.

The Peugeot Bipper is a small delivery van sold by French automaker Peugeot since May 2008. It shares its body, platform and most components with the contemporary Citroën Nemo and Fiat Fiorino.

The Citroën Nemo, Fiat Fiorino III, and Peugeot Bipper were developed jointly with Tofaş, following an agreement signed on 31 March 2005. The vans are manufactured on behalf of all the partners in Bursa by Tofaş.

The Bipper is marketed as a "mini cargovan" designed for big and small cities, cheaper and a little smaller than the Peugeot Partner.

The Peugeot Bipper Tepee is a small MPV, which was also introduced in 2008, and is based on the same platform.

2016 facelift

In April 2016, Fiat Professional introduce a facelift for the Fiorino range, featured a new front bumper with a chrome strip that incorporates the design of the Doblò and Ducato brothers. Also new are the alloy wheels and plastic covers. Inside the new steering wheel is a new infotainment system developed by Magneti Marelli with a 5-inch touchscreen that integrates car radio, satellite navigation, bluetooth, USB, and AUX. The engine range consists of the 1.4 petrol Fire with 77 horsepower, the 1.4 Natural Power petrol/methane, and the diesel 1.3 Multijet with 80 and 95 horsepower. Fiat also introduced a low emission version called EcoJet available with a 1.3 diesel engine with manual or an automated manual gearbox (called Comfort-Matic, an evolution of the previous Dualogic); the EcoJet has low rolling impact tires and a variable displacement oil pump. Trim levels include Cargo, Combined and Panorama versions, which also includes the Adventure set-up (available in all three versions) with raised trim and suspension, M+S tires, specific alloy wheels, additional bumper bands and Traction+ differential lock electronic system.

The PSA brand versions, on the other hand, were not updated and went out of production in December 2017.

In July 2018, the Fiat Fiorino engines were re-homologated Euro 6D-Temp.

In February 2022, the new Fiat logo is adopted at the front of the vehicle.

Engines

Sales and production figures

Latin America (2013–present)

In 2013, a new version of the Fiat Fiorino (different from the European version) was introduced in Brazil, where it is also produced.

As the previous Fiorino was based on the first generation Fiat Uno and its later Fiat Mille evolution, the new Fiorino is based on the second generation Fiat Uno (327), an all new model launched in 2010.

The vehicle was introduced in October 2013 as a 2014 model, at the 19th edition of the Fenatran (International Road Cargo Transportation Show, held in São Paulo), alongside the Uno Furgão — the panel van version of the Uno it is based on.

The Fiorino is offered with the 1.4 Evo Flex flexible fuel 1,368 cc four-cylinder used in the Uno, from the Fire engine family.

The Brazilian-spec Fiorino is sold under the Ram Trucks division in Mexico as the Ram Promaster Rapid and in Chile, Bolivia, Colombia, and Peru as the Ram V700 Rapid.

In December 2021, Fiat presented a facelift of the model with minor visual changes, as 2022 model year.

In May 2022, the Brazilian-spec Fiorino is sold under the Peugeot brand too in Brazil, as Partner Rapid.

Sales

Notes

References

External links

 Fiat Professional UK

Fiorino
Vans
Cars introduced in 1977
1980s cars
1990s cars
2000s cars
2010s cars
Cars of Turkey
Front-wheel-drive vehicles
Cars of Brazil
Cars of Argentina